Jiří Průcha (born 10 August 1955) is a Czech former professional tennis player.

Born in Prague, Průcha was based in West Germany during his career and had a best singles ranking of 298 in the world. At the Stuttgart Grand Prix tournament in 1978 he had a 6–0, 6–1 first round win over Jan Kodes. Another of his best wins was against Patrick Proisy at Hamburg in 1979.

References

External links
 
 

1955 births
Living people
Czech male tennis players
Czechoslovak male tennis players
Tennis players from Prague
Czech emigrants to Germany